Sven Fischer (born 16 April 1971) is a former German biathlete. He trained with the WSV Oberhof 05 club, and was coached by Frank Ullrich and Fritz Fischer (national coaches) and Klaus Siebert (club coach). After the 2006/07 biathlon season, he retired.

Background
His apparent talents for athletics was discovered early and already in third grade he was training three times a week in the BSG Werkzeugkombinat sports club. In the fifth grade, he became district champion of his age class.

In September 1983, the boarding school Kinder- und Jugendsportschule (KJS) accepted him on a biathlon youth scholarship. After his exam in 1989, he joined the army studying to become a sports teacher. The German reunification and the fall of the Berlin wall and subsequent unification of the East and West German armies, forced him to leave the military in 1990.

He instead started training for international sport events, but in 1989, when Fischer was eighteen, he had problems with both his kneecaps after a growth spurt as a youth: "I grew too fast and didn't stretch well." As a result he sat out the whole of the 1989 season and thought he might have to retire from the sport at his young age. However, in the 1990 season when he came back he found that he had become more powerful than before his injury, and in December 1990, he celebrated his first European cup victory in sprint in Hochfilzen. One week later he participated in his first world cup relay. He was soon rewarded B–status and because of success in the German Championship in 1992 he qualified for the world cup in Pokljuka in December 1992.

In 1993, he won a World Championship gold medal in the 10 km Team in Borovets, Bulgaria, and a world cup race, in sprint, in Kontiolahti, Finland. In 1994, he won the Olympic bronze medal in the 20 km individual.

Fischer was an integral part of the German biathlon team until his retirement.

Fischer has eight biathlon victories at the Holmenkollen ski festival, three in individual (1995, 1999, 2004), two in sprint (1995, 1999), two in pursuit (2002, 2004), and one in mass start (2001).

Career
Fischer won the World Cup overall on two occasions (1996/97 and 1998/99), he's also come second twice (1993/94 and 2004/05), and third three times (1995/96, 1997/98, and 1999/2000). In the 2004/05 season Fischer lost the World Cup by only eleven points, which he most probably would have earned had he competed in the final race of the year, but he missed it because of a cold.

In the Olympics, Fischer won four gold medals, one of them in the sprint in 2006 Winter Olympics, and the other three in the relay (1994, 1998, and 2006). He also won two silver, and two bronze.

In the World Championships, Fischer amassed seven gold medals, six silver, and seven bronze. Four of his gold medals were won in relays, one in the team event, one in the individual, and one in the mass start. In the sprint he has one of his silver medals (Hochfilzen 2005). He has three bronze from the pursuit (Kontiolahti 1999, Pokljuka 2001, and Hochfilzen 2005). In the mass start he has one gold (Oslo Holmenkollen 1999), two silver (Khanty-Mansiysk 2003 and Hochfilzen 2005), and one bronze (Pokljuka 2001). His remaining silver and two bronze came in the relay (silver in Ruhpolding 1996, bronzes in Borovets 1993 and Lahti 2000).

Biathlon results
All results are sourced from the International Biathlon Union.

Olympic Games
8 medals (4 gold, 2 silver, 2 bronze)

*Pursuit was added as an event in 2002, with mass start being added in 2006.

World Championships
20 medals (7 gold, 6 silver, 7 bronze)

*During Olympic seasons competitions are only held for those events not included in the Olympic program.
**Team was removed as an event in 1998, and pursuit was added in 1997 with mass start being added in 1999 and the mixed relay in 2005.

Individual victories
33 victories (6 In, 13 Sp, 10 Pu, 4 MS)

*Results are from UIPMB and IBU races which include the Biathlon World Cup, Biathlon World Championships and the Winter Olympic Games.

See also
List of multiple Olympic gold medalists

References

External links
Fan page
 

1971 births
Living people
People from Schmalkalden
Sportspeople from Thuringia
German male biathletes
Biathletes at the 1994 Winter Olympics
Biathletes at the 1998 Winter Olympics
Biathletes at the 2002 Winter Olympics
Biathletes at the 2006 Winter Olympics
Olympic biathletes of Germany
Medalists at the 1994 Winter Olympics
Medalists at the 1998 Winter Olympics
Medalists at the 2002 Winter Olympics
Medalists at the 2006 Winter Olympics
Olympic medalists in biathlon
Olympic bronze medalists for Germany
Olympic silver medalists for Germany
Olympic gold medalists for Germany
Biathlon World Championships medalists
Holmenkollen Ski Festival winners
20th-century German people
21st-century German people